The 2004 Intense Football League season was the first season of the Intense Football League. The league champions were the Amarillo Dusters, who defeated the Lubbock Lone Stars in Intense Bowl I.

Standings

 Green indicates clinched playoff berth
 Black indicates best regular season record

Playoffs

Intense Football League
Intense Football League seasons